Sari Karjalainen (born 26 June 1968 in Ylitornio as Sari Räsänen) is a Finnish wheelchair curler.

She participated in the 2014 and 2018 Winter Paralympics where Finnish team finished on tenth and eleventh places respectively.

Her husband Markku is also a member of the Finland national wheelchair curling team.

Teams

Mixed doubles

References

External links 

Profile at the official website for the 2014 Winter Paralympics
Profile at the official website for the 2018 Winter Paralympics (web archive)
 Video: 

Living people
1968 births
People from Ylitornio
Finnish female curlers
Finnish wheelchair curlers
Paralympic wheelchair curlers of Finland
Wheelchair curlers at the 2014 Winter Paralympics
Wheelchair curlers at the 2018 Winter Paralympics
Finnish wheelchair curling champions
Sportspeople from Lapland (Finland)